Joanne Mitchelson (born 7 January 1971) is a Tasmanian-born artist whose watercolours focus on the natural environment of Tasmania.

Joanne was raised near Westbury, Tasmania on her parents' farm.

Joannes paintings can be found with many private collections, the Tasmanian Queen Victoria Museum and Art Gallery in Launceston, the Artists Garret in Deloraine, Tasmania, the Tasmanian Design Centre in Launceston, and the Ulverstone Civic Centre.

In 2008 was one of the principal exhibitors at the Tasmanian Craft Fair Deloraine, Tasmania, and in 2007 Joanne was the runner up in the John Glover Art Award.

Art award 

 For the watercolour Deep Reflection, by the pool of Salome, Walls of Jerusalem National ... Joanna Mitchelson Deep Reflections (commended) http://www.taswatercolours.com.au/aboutartist.htm Tasmanian Water Colour Artists]

References 

1971 births
Living people
Artists from Tasmania
Australian women painters
21st-century Australian women artists
21st-century Australian artists